Aled Jenkins (born 22 April 1990) is a Welsh rugby union player who plays for Ospreys regional team as a centre.

Jenkins made his debut for the Ospreys regional team in 2014 having previously played for Aberavon RFC, Bridgend Ravens, Mumbles RFC and Swansea RFC. Aled also gained international status by playing for Wales 7s.

He is the son of former Swansea RFC player, Gareth Jenkins

References

External links 
Ospreys player profile
 

1990 births
Living people
Ospreys (rugby union) players
Rugby union players from Swansea
Welsh rugby union players
Ealing Trailfinders Rugby Club players
Rugby union centres